Spectravideo International Limited (SVI) was an American computer manufacturer and software house. It was originally called SpectraVision, a company founded by Harry Fox in 1981. The company produced video games and other software for the VIC-20 home computer, the Atari 2600 home video game console, and its CompuMate peripheral. Some of their own computers were compatible with the Microsoft MSX or the IBM PC.

The company ceased operations in 1988.

History 

SpectraVision was founded in 1981 by Harry Fox and Alex Weiss as a distributor of computer games, contracting external developers to write the software.  Their main products were gaming cartridges for the Atari 2600, Colecovision and VIC-20. They also made the world's first ergonomic joystick, the QuickShot. In late 1982 the company was renamed to Spectravideo due to a naming conflict with On Command Corporation's Hotel TV system called SpectraVision.

In the early 1980s, the company developed 11 games for the Atari 2600, including several titles of some rarity: Chase the Chuckwagon, Mangia and Bumper Bash.
A few of their titles were only available through the Columbia House music club.

The company's first attempt at a computer was an add-on for the Atari 2600 called the Spectravideo CompuMate, with a membrane keyboard and very simple programmability.

Spectravideo's first real computers were the SV-318 and SV-328, released in 1983. Both were powered by a Z80 A at 3.6 MHz, but differed in the amount of RAM (SV-318 had 32KB and SV-328 had 80KB total, of which 16KB was reserved for video) and keyboard style. The main operating system, residing in ROM, was a version of Microsoft Extended BASIC, but if the computer was equipped with a floppy drive, the user had the option to boot with CP/M instead. These two computers were precedent to MSX and not fully compatible with the standard, though the changes made to their design to create MSX were minor. The system had a wide range of optional hardware, for example an adapter making it possible to run ColecoVision games on the SVI.
SpectraVideo also created the QuickShot SVI-2000 Robot Arm which could be connected to a Commodore 64 user port or be controlled stand-alone with two joysticks.

In May 1983, Spectravideo went public with the sale of 1 million shares of stock at $6.25 per share in an initial public offering underwritten by brokerage D. H. Blair & Co.

However, Spectravideo quickly ran into trouble. By December 1983 its stock had fallen to 75 cents per share. In March 1984, the company agreed to sell a 60% stake of itself to Hong Kong-based Bondwell Holding in a deal that would have also required the resignation of president Harry Fox and vice-president Alex Weiss. That deal was set aside when Spectravideo was unable to restructure about $2.6 million worth of debt, and another deal where Fanon Courier U.S.A. Inc. would have purchased 80% of the company was struck in July.

The Fanon Courier deal similarly fell through, and Fox resigned as president in September, with Bondwell Holding purchasing over half of the company's stock and installing Bondwell vice-president Christopher Chan as the new president.

A later computer, the Spectravideo SVI-728, was made MSX compatible.

SVI-738, also MSX compatible, came with a built-in 360 KB 3.5" floppy drive.

The last computer produced by Spectravideo was the SVI-838 (also known as Spectravideo X'Press 16). It was a PC and MSX2 in the same device.

Legacy 

The Spectravideo name was used by a UK-based company called SpectraVideo Plc, formerly known as Ash & Newman. That company was founded in 1977, and bought the Spectravideo brand name from Bondwell (SVI owner) in 1988. They sell their own range of Logic3 branded products, and do not have any connection to the old Spectravideo products. The company changed its name to Logic3 in 2006, and entered administration in 2013 after a licensing deal with Ferrari proved to be a failure. The company was formally dissolved on 19 April 2016.

References

External links 
 Samdal.com: Roger's history of SpectraVision—Spectravideo webpage
 Spectravideo.se: Glenn's Spectravideo webpage

1981 disestablishments in the United States
1988 disestablishments in the United States
American companies established in 1981
American companies disestablished in 1988
Computer companies established in 1981
Computer companies disestablished in 1988
Defunct computer companies of the United States
Defunct video game companies of the United States
Home computer hardware companies
MSX
Video game companies established in 1981
Video game companies disestablished in 1988